Silphictidoides is an extinct genus of therocephalian therapsids from the Late Permian of Tanzania. The type species Silphictidoides ruhuhuensis was named by German paleontologist Friedrich von Huene in 1950 from the Tropidostoma Assemblage Zone. Silphictidoides was once classified within the family Silpholestidae. Silphedolestids are no longer recognized as a valid grouping, and Silphictidoides is now considered a basal member of the clade Baurioidea.

References

Baurioids
Therocephalia genera
Lopingian synapsids of Africa
Fossil taxa described in 1950
Lopingian genus first appearances
Lopingian genus extinctions